Stephans is a surname. Notable people with the surname include:

Anton Stephans
Jack Stephans (1939–2020), American football coach
Mike Stephans, American football player

Surnames from given names